The Wicked Lady can refer to:

 The Wicked Lady, a 1945 film
 The Wicked Lady (1983 film), a 1983 remake of the above film
 The Wicked Lady (album), the soundtrack album to the 1983 film, by Tony Banks
 Lady Katherine Ferrers, believed by some to be a notorious highwaywoman known as the "Wicked Lady"
 Wicked Lady, an aspect of Chibiusa, a character in the anime Sailor Moon

See also
 Wicked (disambiguation)